Éric Prodon successfully defended his title. He defeated Alexander Flock, João Sousa, Timo Nieminen, Jonathan Dasnières de Veigy and Augustin Gensse to win this tournament.

Seeds

  Éric Prodon (champion)
  Benoît Paire (second round)
  Florent Serra (first round)
  David Guez (quarterfinals)
  Augustin Gensse (final)
  Andrej Martin (first round)
  Jürgen Zopp (second round)
  Bastian Knittel (first round)

Draw

Finals

Top half

Bottom half

References
 Main Draw
 Qualifying Draw

Tampere Open - Singles
Tampere Open